This is the results breakdown of the local elections held in Andalusia on 26 May 1991. The following tables show detailed results in the autonomous community's most populous municipalities, sorted alphabetically.

Overall

City control
The following table lists party control in the most populous municipalities, including provincial capitals (shown in bold). Gains for a party are displayed with the cell's background shaded in that party's colour.

Municipalities

Alcalá de Guadaíra
Population: 52,168

Algeciras
Population: 102,079

Almería
Population: 161,566

Antequera
Population: 41,863

Benalmádena
Population: 24,972

Cádiz
Population: 156,903

Chiclana de la Frontera
Population: 44,998

Córdoba
Population: 307,275

Dos Hermanas
Population: 72,717

Écija
Population: 36,673

El Ejido
Population: 41,080

El Puerto de Santa María
Population: 64,849

Fuengirola
Population: 41,778

Granada
Population: 268,674

Huelva
Population: 141,002

Jaén
Population: 109,338

Jerez de la Frontera
Population: 186,812

La Línea de la Concepción
Population: 61,597

Linares
Population: 59,150

Málaga
Population: 560,495

Marbella
Population: 81,876

Morón de la Frontera
Population: 29,191

Motril
Population: 47,267

Ronda
Population: 34,102

San Fernando
Population: 83,923

Sanlúcar de Barrameda
Population: 56,375

Seville

Population: 678,218

Utrera
Population: 43,006

Vélez-Málaga
Population: 54,234

References

Andalusia
1991